

Classification 

The winning roster of Olimpija:
  Ivo Daneu
  Igor Jelnikar
  Matija Dermastija
  Emil Logar
  Marjan Kandus
  Karel Kapelj
  Bogdan Müller
  Miha Lokar
  Marko Vrhovec
  Peter Samaluk
  Tomo Vavpetič
  Borut Bassin
  Ivan Potočnik

Coach:  Boris Kristančič

Scoring leaders
 Radivoj Korać (OKK Beograd) – ___ points (__ ppg)
 ???
 ???

Qualification in 1962-63 season European competitions 

FIBA European Champions Cup
 Olimpija (champions)

References

Yugoslav First Basketball League seasons